This is a list of the mammal species recorded in Uruguay. This list is derived from the IUCN Red List which lists species of mammals and includes those mammals that have recently been classified as extinct (since 1500 AD). The taxonomy and naming of the individual species is based on those used in existing Wikipedia articles as of 21 May 2007 and supplemented by the common names and taxonomy from the IUCN, Smithsonian Institution, or University of Michigan where no Wikipedia article was available.

The following tags are used to highlight each species' conservation status as assessed by the International Union for Conservation of Nature:

Some species were assessed using an earlier set of criteria. Species assessed using this system have the following instead of near threatened and least concern categories:

Subclass: Theria

Infraclass: Eutheria

Order: Carnivora (carnivorans)

Carnivorans include over 260 species, the majority of which eat meat as their primary dietary item. They have a characteristic skull shape and dentition.
Suborder: Feliformia
Family: Felidae (cats)
Subfamily: Felinae
Genus: Herpailurus
Jaguarundi, H. yagouaroundi  presence uncertain
Genus: Leopardus
Pampas cat L. colocola 
Geoffroy's cat L. geoffroyi 
Ocelot L. pardalis 
Margay L. wiedii 
Genus: Puma
Cougar, P. concolor 
Subfamily: Pantherinae
Genus: Panthera
Jaguar, P. onca  extirpated
Suborder: Caniformia
Family: Canidae (dogs, foxes)
Genus: Dusicyon
 D. avus 
Genus: Cerdocyon
 Crab-eating fox, C. thous 
Genus: Chrysocyon
 Maned wolf, C. brachyurus  possibly extirpated
Genus: Lycalopex
 Pampas fox, L. gymnocercus 
Family: Procyonidae (raccoons)
Genus: Procyon
 Crab-eating raccoon, P. cancrivorus 
Genus: Nasua
 South American coati, Nasua nasua
Family: Mustelidae (mustelids)
Genus: Lontra
 Neotropical river otter, Lontra longicaudis NT
Genus: Pteronura
 Giant otter, Pteronura brasiliensis EN presence uncertain
Family: Mephitidae
Genus: Conepatus
 Molina's hog-nosed skunk, Conepatus chinga
Family: Otariidae (eared seals, sealions)
Genus: Arctocephalus
 South American fur seal, Arctocephalus australis
Genus: Otaria
 South American sea lion, Otaria flavescens
Family: Phocidae (earless seals)
Genus: Leptonychotes
 Weddell seal, Leptonychotes weddellii
Genus: Lobodon
 Crabeater seal, Lobodon carcinophaga
Genus: Mirounga
 Southern elephant seal, Mirounga leonina

Order: Cingulata (armadillos)

The armadillos are small mammals with a bony armored shell. They are native to the Americas. There are around 20 extant species.

Family: Dasypodidae (armadillos)
Subfamily: Dasypodinae
Genus: Dasypus
 Southern long-nosed armadillo, D. hybridus 
 Nine-banded armadillo, D. novemcinctus 
Subfamily: Euphractinae
Genus: Euphractus
 Six-banded armadillo, E. sexcinctus 
Subfamily: Tolypeutinae
Genus: Cabassous
 Greater naked-tailed armadillo, C. tatouay 
Genus: Priodontes
 Giant armadillo, P. maximus  extirpated

Order: Pilosa (anteaters, sloths and tamanduas)

The order Pilosa is extant only in the Americas and includes the anteaters, sloths, and tamanduas.

Suborder: Vermilingua
Family: Myrmecophagidae (American anteaters)
Genus: Myrmecophaga
 Giant anteater, Myrmecophaga tridactyla VU possibly extirpated
Genus: Tamandua
 Southern tamandua, Tamandua tetradactyla LC

Order: Rodentia (rodents)

Rodents make up the largest order of mammals, with over 40% of mammalian species. They have two incisors in the upper and lower jaw which grow continually and must be kept short by gnawing.

Suborder: Hystricognathi
Family: Erethizontidae (New World porcupines)
Subfamily: Erethizontinae
Genus: Coendou
 Paraguaian hairy dwarf porcupine, Coendou spinosus LR/lc
Family: Caviidae (guinea pigs)
Subfamily: Caviinae
Genus: Cavia
 Brazilian guinea pig, Cavia aperea LR/lc
Subfamily: Hydrochoerinae (capybaras and rock cavies)
Genus: Hydrochoerus
 Capybara Hydrochoerus hydrochaeris LR/lc
Family: Cuniculidae
Genus: Cuniculus
 Lowland paca, Cuniculus paca LC
Family: Ctenomyidae
Genus: Ctenomys
 Tiny tuco-tuco, Ctenomys minutus LR/lc
 Pearson's tuco-tuco, Ctenomys pearsoni LR/lc
 Collared tuco-tuco, Ctenomys torquatus LR/lc
Family: Myocastoridae (coypus)
Genus: Myocastor
 Coypu, Myocastor coypus LR/lc
Suborder: Sciurognathi
Family: Cricetidae
Subfamily: Sigmodontinae
Genus: Akodon
 Azara's grass mouse, Akodon azarae LR/lc
 Cursor grass mouse, Akodon cursor LR/lc
Genus: Calomys
 Small vesper mouse, Calomys laucha LR/lc
Genus: Deltamys
 Kemp's grass mouse, Deltamys kempi LR/lc
Genus: Holochilus
 Web-footed marsh rat, Holochilus brasiliensis LR/lc
Genus: Lundomys
 Lund's amphibious rat, Lundomys molitor LR/lc
Genus: Necromys
 Dark bolo mouse, Necromys obscurus LR/lc
Genus: Nectomys
 Scaly-footed water rat, Nectomys squamipes LR/lc
Genus: Oligoryzomys
 Yellow pygmy rice rat, Oligoryzomys flavescens LR/lc
 Black-footed pygmy rice rat, Oligoryzomys nigripes LC
Genus: Oxymycterus
 Long-nosed hocicudo, Oxymycterus nasutus LR/lc
 Red hocicudo, Oxymycterus rufus LR/lc
Genus: Reithrodon
 Bunny rat, Reithrodon auritus LR/lc
Genus: Scapteromys
 Waterhouse's swamp rat, Scapteromys tumidus LR/lc
Genus: Wilfredomys
 Greater Wilfred's mouse, Wilfredomys oenax LR/lc

Order: Chiroptera (bats)

The bats' most distinguishing feature is that their forelimbs are developed as wings, making them the only mammals capable of flight. Bat species account for about 20% of all mammals.

Family: Noctilionidae
Genus: Noctilio
 Lesser bulldog bat, Noctilio albiventris LR/lc
 Greater bulldog bat, Noctilio leporinus LR/lc
Family: Vespertilionidae
Subfamily: Myotinae
Genus: Myotis
 Silver-tipped myotis, Myotis albescens LR/lc
 Yellowish myotis, Myotis levis LR/lc
 Riparian myotis, Myotis riparius LR/lc
Subfamily: Vespertilioninae
Genus: Eptesicus
 Brazilian brown bat, Eptesicus brasiliensis LR/lc
 Diminutive serotine, Eptesicus diminutus LR/lc
Genus: Histiotus
 Strange big-eared brown bat, Histiotus alienus VU
 Small big-eared brown bat, Histiotus montanus LR/lc
Genus: Lasiurus
 Desert red bat, Lasiurus blossevillii LR/lc
 Hoary bat, Lasiurus cinereus LR/lc
 Southern yellow bat, Lasiurus ega LR/lc
Family: Molossidae
Genus: Eumops
 Dwarf bonneted bat, Eumops bonariensis LR/lc
Genus: Molossops
 Dwarf dog-faced bat, Molossops temminckii LR/lc
Genus: Molossus
 Velvety free-tailed bat, Molossus molossus LR/lc
Genus: Nyctinomops
 Big free-tailed bat, Nyctinomops macrotis LR/lc
Genus: Tadarida
 Mexican free-tailed bat, Tadarida brasiliensis LR/nt
Family: Phyllostomidae
Subfamily: Stenodermatinae
Genus: Sturnira
 Little yellow-shouldered bat, Sturnira lilium LR/lc
Genus: Platyrrhinus
 White-lined broad-nosed bat, Platyrrhinus lineatus LR/lc
Subfamily: Desmodontinae
Genus: Desmodus
 Common vampire bat, Desmodus rotundus LR/lc

Order: Cetacea (whales)

The order Cetacea includes whales, dolphins and porpoises. They are the mammals most fully adapted to aquatic life with a spindle-shaped nearly hairless body, protected by a thick layer of blubber, and forelimbs and tail modified to provide propulsion underwater.

Suborder: Mysticeti
Family: Balaenidae
Genus: Eubalaena
 Southern right whale, Eubalaena australis
Family: Balaenopteridae
Subfamily: Balaenopterinae
Genus: Balaenoptera
 Common minke whale, Balaenoptera acutorostrata
 Antarctic minke whale, Balaenoptera bonaerensis DD
 Sei whale, Balaenoptera borealis EN
 Bryde's whale, Balaenoptera brydei DD
 Fin whale, Balaenoptera physalus EN
 Blue whale, Balaenoptera musculus EN
Genus: Megaptera
 Humpback whale, Megaptera novaeangliae LC
Suborder: Odontoceti
Superfamily: Platanistoidea
Family: Pontoporiidae
Genus: Pontoporia
 La Plata dolphin, Pontoporia blainvillei DD
Family: Phocoenidae
Genus: Phocoena
 Spectacled porpoise, Phocoena dioptrica DD
 Burmeister's porpoise, Phocoena spinipinnis DD
Family: Physeteridae
Genus: Physeter
 Sperm whale, Physeter macrocephalus VU
Family: Kogiidae
Genus: Kogia
Pygmy sperm whale, K. breviceps 
Family: Ziphidae
Genus: Ziphius
 Cuvier's beaked whale, Ziphius cavirostris DD
Genus: Berardius
 Arnoux's beaked whale, Berardius arnuxii
Subfamily: Hyperoodontinae
Genus: Hyperoodon
 Southern bottlenose whale, Hyperoodon planifrons
Genus: Mesoplodon
 Blainville's beaked whale, Mesoplodon densirostris DD
 Gray's beaked whale, Mesoplodon grayi DD
 Hector's beaked whale, Mesoplodon hectori DD
 Strap-toothed whale, Mesoplodon layardii DD
Family: Delphinidae (marine dolphins)
Genus: Steno
 Rough-toothed dolphin, Steno bredanensis DD
Genus: Tursiops
 Common bottlenose dolphin, Tursiops truncatus DD
Genus: Stenella
 Pantropical spotted dolphin, Stenella attenuata
 Atlantic spotted dolphin, Stenella frontalis DD
 Striped dolphin, Stenella coeruleoalba
 Spinner dolphin, Stenella longirostris
Genus: Delphinus
 Long-beaked common dolphin, Delphinus capensis
Genus: Lagenodelphis
 Fraser's dolphin, Lagenodelphis hosei
Genus: Grampus
 Risso's dolphin, Grampus griseus
Genus: Lissodelphis
 Southern right whale dolphin, Lissodelphis peronii DD
Genus: Feresa
 Pygmy killer whale, Feresa attenuata DD
Genus: Pseudorca
 False killer whale, Pseudorca crassidens
Genus: Orcinus
Orca, O. orca 
Genus: Globicephala
 Long-finned pilot whale, Globicephala melas DD
 Short-finned pilot whale, Globicephala macrorhynchus DD

Order: Artiodactyla (even-toed ungulates)

The even-toed ungulates are ungulates whose weight is borne about equally by the third and fourth toes, rather than mostly or entirely by the third as in perissodactyls. There are about 220 artiodactyl species, including many that are of great economic importance to humans.

Family: Tayassuidae (peccaries)
Genus: Dicotyles
 Collared peccary, Dicotyles tajacu LC
Family: Cervidae (deer)
Subfamily: Capreolinae
Genus: Blastocerus
 Marsh deer, Blastocerus dichotomus VU  extirpated
Genus: Mazama
 Gray brocket, Mazama gouazoupira LC
Genus: Ozotoceros
 Pampas deer, Ozotoceros bezoarticus NT
Subfamily: Cervinae
Genus: Dama
 European fallow deer, D. dama LC introduced

Infraclass: Metatheria

Order: Didelphimorphia (common opossums)

Didelphimorphia is the order of common opossums of the Western Hemisphere. Opossums probably diverged from the basic South American marsupials in the late Cretaceous or early Paleocene. They are small to medium-sized marsupials, about the size of a large house cat, with a long snout and prehensile tail.

Family: Didelphidae (American opossums)
Subfamily: Didelphinae
Genus: Didelphis
 White-eared opossum, Didelphis albiventris LR/lc
Genus: Gracilinanus
 Agile gracile opossum, Gracilinanus agilis LR/nt
Genus: Lutreolina
 Big lutrine opossum, Lutreolina crassicaudata LR/lc
Genus: Monodelphis
 Yellow-sided opossum, Monodelphis dimidiata LR/nt

See also
Fauna of Uruguay
List of chordate orders
Lists of mammals by region
List of prehistoric mammals
Mammal classification
List of mammals described in the 2000s

References

External links

Uruguay
Mammals

Uruguay